1952 in philosophy

Events

Publications 
 Jacques Maritain, The Range of Reason (1952, original publication?)
 Paul Tillich, The Courage to Be (1952)
 C. S. Lewis, Mere Christianity (1952)
 Leo Strauss, Persecution and the Art of Writing (1952)
 Simone Weil, Gravity and Grace (1952)

Births 
 March 11 - Douglas Adams (died 2001)
 March 12 - André Comte-Sponville 
 April 1 - Bernard Stiegler
 April 9 - Robert Zubrin 
 April 15 - Avital Ronell 
 August 8 - Jostein Gaarder
 October 27 - Francis Fukuyama 
 Galen Strawson (unknown)
 Manuel de Landa (unknown)

Deaths 
 May 6 - Maria Montessori (born 1870)
 June 1 - John Dewey (born 1859)
 September 26 - George Santayana (born 1863)
 November 20 - Benedetto Croce (born 1866)

References 

Philosophy
20th-century philosophy
Philosophy by year